Carmen Lelia Cristóbal is an Argentine professor of botany at the National University of the Northeast (UNNE) in Corrientes.

In 1959, she earned her doctorate degree in botany at the National University of Tucumán. Her specialty was the family Sterculiaceae, and her thesis on the genus Ayenia earned her two prizes: the "Ernesto Padilla" Prize in 1960 from the Miguel Lillo Foundation (Fundación Miguel Lillo) and the "Cristobal Hicken" Prize in 1961 from the National Academy of Sciences of Argentina.

Cristóbal was a docent at Tucumán in 1962 at the same time that she began work as a CONICET researcher.

In 1964 she became a professor of Botany I at Corrientes, where she also lectured as part of the Faculty of Exact Sciences.

Cristóbal and her husband, Antonio Krapovickas, established UNNE's Instituto de Botánica del Nordeste, or Ibone, at over 250,000 specimens.

She has written over 40 works, including 4 taxonomic revisions, and her work with the genus Byttneria is particularly noted.

Awards & distinctions
"Ernesto Padilla" Prize recipient (1960)
"Cristobal Hicken" Prize recipient (1961)
CONICET researcher (1962 – ?)

References

20th-century Argentine botanists
Year of birth missing (living people)
Living people
20th-century Argentine women scientists
Women botanists